K. G. William Dahl  (February 3, 1883 - September 9, 1917) was a Swedish-American Lutheran pastor, author and social advocate.

Background
Kjell Gustaf William Dahl was born at Laholm in Halland, Sweden. He was the son of Samuel Dahl (1847-1932) and Katarina Lovisa Peterson (1859-1931).
In his youth, his family moved to the parish of Osby, in Skåne where his father became rector of the local parish church.  Both Dahl's father and grandfather had been Lutheran ministers of the Church of Sweden. His brother was the composer Viking Dahl (1895-1945).

Dahl attended college at Kristianstad and Malmö. He immigrated to America from Sweden in 1902. He attended Augustana College and Seminary in Rock Island, Illinois. His home in Osby had been near that of Augustana College founder Tuve Hasselquist.

Career
Dahl was ordained into the ministry of the Augustana Evangelical Lutheran Church at New Britain, Connecticut during 1907. Dahl was initially assigned to  Immanuel Hospital in Omaha, Nebraska where he then served as associate minister under Dr. Lindberg. He subsequently served rural parishes in Roberts County, South Dakota, including the Walla Lutheran Church in New Effington.  Dahl also served the nearby Lake Traverse Indian Reservation.

In 1912, Dahl wrote Hedens Barn, a book written in his native Swedish language. This book has a setting in rural Roberts County, South Dakota and tells of life among the early pioneer homesteaders. The book is a study of people struggling against the elements to make a new life on the prairie.

Dahl moved on to Axtell, Nebraska in 1912 as the local Lutheran minister. Within the year, he called a meeting to organize the Bethphage Mission Association to develop the institution he envisioned. A charitable institution for the care and treatment of epileptics, it was operated by Swedish Lutherans.

Bethphage Mission reflected a Swedish National Romantic architectural style hearkening to Pastor Dahl's native Skåne in Sweden. Bethphage Mission soon became known as the "miracle of the prairie" for its dedication to helping people with disabilities grow toward independence.

In 2003, Mosaic, an affiliate of Lutheran Services in America, was formed through the consolidation of Bethphage Mission with Martin Luther Homes. A heritage of supporting and advocating for people with disabilities continues to the present day  through Mosaic at Bethphage Village.

Selected works
 Hedens Barn (Rock Island, IL: Augustana Book Concern. 1912. translated by Emeroy Johnson)

References

External links
Bethphage Mission
Mosaic History Page

1883 births
1917 deaths
Augustana College (Illinois) alumni
American male novelists
20th-century American novelists
20th-century American Lutheran clergy
People from Osby Municipality
Swedish emigrants to the United States
20th-century American male writers